The Anti Horse Thief Association was a vigilance committee, organized at Fort Scott, Kansas, in 1859 to provide protection against marauders thriving on border warfare.  It resembled other vigilance societies in organization and methods, although it did not share some of the shadier tactics of other vigilance committees and members of the Regulators.  It achieved great success in apprehending offenders over a wide area.  Though it initially focused on horse theft, it diversified into other areas while still retaining the original name.

See also
Bentonville Anti-Horse Thief Society
The Society in Dedham for Apprehending Horse Thieves
Stolen Horse International

References

"Kansas: a cyclopedia of state history, embracing events, institutions, industries, counties, cities, towns, prominent persons, etc." (1912)

External links
 Encyclopedia of Oklahoma History and Culture - Anti-Horse Thief Association
 Anti Horse Thief Association
 The Horse Thief Detectives

American vigilantes
Kansas in the American Civil War
Missouri in the American Civil War
People of the American Old West
Organizations established in 1859
1859 establishments in Kansas Territory